Llanelli ("St Elli's Parish") is a market town and the largest community in Carmarthenshire and the preserved county of Dyfed, Wales. The town had a population of 25,168 in 2011, estimated in 2019 at 26,225. The local authority was Llanelli Borough Council when the county of Dyfed existed, but it has been under Carmarthenshire County Council since 1996.

Name

Spelling
The anglicised spelling “Llanelly” was used until 1966, when it was changed to Llanelli after a local public campaign. It remains in the name of a local historic building, Llanelly House. It should not be confused with the village and parish of Llanelly, in south-east Wales near Abergavenny.

Llanelly in Victoria, Australia was named after this town of Llanelli, using the spelling current at that time.

History

The beginnings of Llanelli can be found on the lands of present-day Parc Howard. An Iron Age hill fort once stood which was called Bryn-Caerau (hill of the forts). Evidence suggests there were five hill forts from Old Road to the Dimpath. During the Roman conquest of Wales it is unknown whether the area of Llanelli was part of the Silures tribe or the Demetae tribe. There is evidence of a Roman camp near St Elli shopping centre but it is unknown when it was built, and it was completely abandoned shortly after construction either due to the Romans thinking the area was completely worthless or due to a raid by either rebellious local Britons or an Irish raid. During the post-Roman period, the area of Llanelli may have been heavily populated with Pagans as there's evidence of a pagan worship church under the Saint Elli church, it may have had frequent raids from Brycheiniog and Dyfed in order to Christianise the area to which it would eventually fall into Dyfed. During the early medieval period, it is said a saint named Elli, or Ellyw, who in legend is the son or daughter of King Brychan established a church on the banks of the Afon Lliedi, it's also mentioned that one of Brychan’s daughters Tydfil was murdered by Pagans, these possibly could have been the Pagans from Llanelli at the time during a raid. The original church would have been a wooden or partly stone, thatched structure. According to early Welsh transcripts, the church of Carnwyllion, i.e. the mother church of the cwmwd, was at Llanelli. The current St Elli's Church dates from the 14th century although extensive restorations were completed in 1911.

According to the Red Book of Hergest during the Norman invasion of Wales Rhys Ieuanc and his uncle Maelgwn ap Rhys took the allegiance of all the Welsh of the Kingdom of Dyfed apart from one region. Cemais would not pay allegiance and thus Rhys Ieuanc and his uncle, Maelgwn ap Rhys, attacked and pillaged the area moving on to attack the castles at Narberth and Maenclochog. At this time Rhys Ieuanc moved against Cedweli and Carnwyllion with his forces besieging and burning Carnwyllion Castle in 1215.

Llanelli was industrialised in the early 19th century as the global centre for tinplate production. Lying near the Western fringe of the South Wales Coal Field, Llanelli played an important role in industry, with coal exported through three small docks along with the copper and tin produced within the town itself. Although Llanelli is not located within the South Wales valleys, coal from the Gwendraeth and the Loughor Valleys was transported to Llanelli for export. The Stepney Family and other prominent families (including the Raby family, Howard family and Cowell family), played an important role in the development of the town. Aside from industry, Llanelli is also renowned for its pottery, which has a unique cockerel hand-painted on each item. A collection of this pottery can bee seen at the Llanelli Museum in Parc Howard.

Llanelli people are sometimes nicknamed "Turks", for uncertain reasons. One theory is that many Turkish sailors once called at the port on their voyages.

Several communities nearby may be included colloquially in Llanelli.

Culture and language

National Eisteddfod
Llanelli hosted the National Eisteddfod six times between 1895 and 2014.

Welsh language
In the mid-20th century, Llanelli was the world's largest town in which more than half the inhabitants spoke a Celtic language. It is ranked as the seventh largest urban area in Wales. According to the 2011 UK Census returns, 23.7 per cent of Llanelli town residents habitually spoke Welsh. However, the area around Llanelli is a Welsh stronghold, in which 56 per cent do so in communities such as Llwynhendy and Burry Port.

During the 1950s, Trefor and Eileen Beasley campaigned to get Llanelli Rural Council to distribute tax papers in Welsh by refusing to pay taxes until their demand was met. The council reacted by sending in the bailiffs and selling their furniture to recover the money owed. The Beasleys' neighbours bought the furniture and returned it to them. The council finally reversed its policy in the 1960s, giving Welsh equal status with English.

Economy
In 1991 Llanelli was a distinct travel to work area, but a 2001-based revision has merged it into a wider one of Swansea Bay.

Manufacture
Several firms, including Tata Steel Europe tinplate at Trostre and Dyfed Steels, are based in the Llanelli area and service the automotive industry. The Technium Performance Engineering Centre was developed at Llanelli Gate as a business incubator for businesses in the automotive, motor sport and aerospace sectors.

The traditional industries of Llanelli have gradually declined in recent decades. Local government has responded by seeking to attract tourism with developments such as the Machynys Golf Course, retail parks at Trostre and Pemberton, and the Millennium Coastal Park. The core shopping area has now moved largely from the town centre to the Trostre/Pemberton area.

Brewing
The longstanding Felinfoel Brewery continues in Felinfoel, just outside the town.

Rev. James Buckley was an ordained Methodist minister, born in Oldham, Lancashire in 1770, who after moving to Llanelli towards the end of the 18th century became involved in establishing a small brewery. After the death of the owner, Buckley gained possession of the brewery and changed its name to Buckley's. In 1998, the brewery was bought by Brains Brewery, which transferred production to its facility in Cardiff. However, Brains continues to produce The Reverend James, a bitter named in Buckley's memory. Since then the Llanelli brewery has been partly demolished.

Leisure and tourism
In the past decade, the longstanding emphasis on heavy industry has shifted towards the tertiary sector employment in leisure and tourism. Ongoing developments include the new Llanelli Scarlets rugby stadium, the Old Castle Works leisure village (see below) and a National Hunt racecourse at Ffos Las near Trimsaran. Machynys Ponds, a Site of Special Scientific Interest notable for its dragonfly population, lies a mile to the south.

Religion

Nonconformism

From the early 19th to late 20th centuries, Llanelli was a major centre of Welsh nonconformism. At the end of the Second World War there were 22 chapels in the town of Llanelli, and their history was chronicled in a volume by the BBC journalist Huw Edwards. Many of the chapels have now closed and others are in sharp decline, with only two or three likely to survive as functioning chapels in the 2020s.

The most well known of Llanelli's chapels is probably Capel Als, where David Rees was a minister for many years in the 19th century. Llanelli had seven other Independent (Congregationalist) chapels, namely Tabernacle, Lloyd Street, Siloah, Soar, Ebenezer, Dock Chapel, and Park Church (the only chapel where services were conducted in English).

The Tabernacle Chapel built in 1872–1873 by John Humphreys of Morriston overlooks the Town Hall. There is a prominent four-pillared Corinthian arcade at the entrance. The building was Grade II* listed in December 1992. It is used as a venue by the Llanelli Choral Society. Other listed chapels include Bethel Baptist Chapel in Copperworks Road, Park Congregational Chapel, Zion Baptist Chapel at Island Place, and Hall Street Methodist Church.

Situated on Waunlanyrafon, across the road from the police station, is the local Catholic Church, Our Lady Queen of Peace Church.

Church in Wales

The parish church of St Elli has a medieval tower. The body of the church was rebuilt by G. F. Bodley in 1905–1906. It is a Grade II* listed building. Several other churches in the town are also listed buildings, but made redundant by the Church in Wales and now in private ownership. They include All Saints' and St Alban's.

Sport

Rugby union
The town's rugby union teams – the Scarlets, who compete in the Pro14, and Llanelli RFC in the Welsh Premiership – play at Parc y Scarlets, which opened in November 2008 in Pemberton. Previously they had played at Stradey Park, home to Llanelli RFC for over 130 years and one venue used for the 1999 Rugby World Cup, hosting the match between Argentina and Samoa on 10 October 1999.

The Welsh folk song "Sosban Fach" (Little Saucepan) is mostly associated with Llanelli RFC.

Many rugby clubs have notable scalps collected from touring international sides but Llanelli has in its rugby history one of the greatest scalps ever. On 31 October 1972, in one of the most famous results in rugby union history, Llanelli beat the New Zealand national team 9–3 in front of around 20,000 spectators. Llanelli centre Roy Bergiers scored the only try of the game, charging down a clearance by All Black scrum-half Lin Colling after a penalty from Phil Bennett rebounded back into play off the crossbar.

There is a strong junior rugby core, including club sides such as Felinfoel, New Dock Stars, Llangennech and the Llanelli Wanderers. In 2005, Coedcae School won the Inter-Schools Cup of Wales with an 8–5 victory over Brynteg Comprehensive.

Rugby league
Llanelli's West Wales Raiders play in RFL League 1, the third tier of rugby league in England and Wales. The club is based at Stebonheath Park.

Association football
Stebonheath Park is the home of football club Llanelli A.F.C., which plays in the Cymru South. The town has many active local teams and tournaments such as the 2018 Challenge Cup, where West End United beat Trostre Sports AFC.

Bowls
Llanelli hosts the annual Llanelli Open Bowls Tournaments, the oldest and most prestigious of which, the Roberts-Rolfe Open Singles event, has been run since 1926 and has a first prize of £600. The contests are held from July to September in Parc Howard.

Golf
The Llanelli area has two golf courses: the Machynys Peninsula Golf & Country Club which hosted the Wales Ladies Championship of Europe from 2005 until 2008, and Glyn Abbey Golf Club, which was named Welsh Golf Club of the Year 2009.

Snooker
Llanelli is the birthplace and home of Terry Griffiths OBE, snooker world champion in 1979 and runner-up in 1988. Now a coach and snooker commentator, he runs the Terry Griffiths Matchroom in the town centre.

Media
Llanelli is home to Tinopolis, one of Britain's largest independent media producers. It has subsidiaries that produce over 2,500 hours of broadcast television, including English language programmes such as Question Time for the BBC and Welsh-language television programs such as Wedi 7 for S4C.

Coverage of local affairs appears in two papers, the Llanelli Star founded in 1909 and Llanelli Herald launched in 2015. Online coverage is found on Llanelli Online. The main county-wide radio station is Radio Carmarthenshire. Other radio stations covering the area are The Wave, Greatest Hits Radio South Wales, Easy Radio, Radio BGM, which serves the Prince Philip Hospital and the local community online, and regional station Heart South Wales.

Local attractions

Some local attractions include:
The Millennium Coastal Path along  of coastline from Loughor to Pembrey offers views of the Gower Peninsula and the opportunity of traffic-free cycling.
Llanelly House is an example of an early 18th-century Georgian town house. Located directly opposite the parish church, it is currently in a poor state of repair, but the town council recently bought it with an eye to civic and public use. It was built for Thomas Stepney, the Member of Parliament (MP) for Carmarthenshire, in 1714. John Wesley, the early leader of the Methodist movement, stayed there several times. It also featured in the first series of the BBC television show, Restoration.
Parc Howard Museum is set in the grounds of Parc Howard. The museum houses a collection of Llanelly Pottery (so spelt), an art collection and material on the history of the town.

Leisure
The Ffwrnes Theatre opened in late 2012, replacing the Theatr Elli, which was part of the Llanelli Entertainment Centre. A multi-screen cinema opened in October 2012. Much is being spent on regenerating the central shopping district.

Llanelli holds festivals, carnivals and events throughout the year. They include:
Welsh International Open, a competition of the World Bowls Tour (February)
Into the Future Festival — educational event about the environment and technology, organised by the county council (August)
Llanelli Big Day Out — pop and live music event (August)
Llanelli Beer Festival — official CAMRA event (August)
Llanelli Christmas Carnival (November)
Llanelli Ramblers Festival of Walks, an annual walking festival, late Spring Bank Holiday weekend (May)
Llanelli Pride (first Saturday in August)

Transport
Llanelli is linked with the M4 motorway via the A4138 and with Swansea via the Loughor Bridge on the A484. It is served by regular bus services between Swansea and Carmarthen and a National Express service to London.

Services from Llanelli railway station on the Great Western Crescent south of the town centre connect with Fishguard Harbour and Swansea along the West Wales Line. It is the terminus of the Heart of Wales Line for Craven Arms and Shrewsbury. There are daily Great Western Railway services with London Paddington and regular services with Cardiff Central and Manchester Piccadilly. The district is also served by stations at Bynea, Llangennech, Pembrey & Burry Port and Kidwelly.

Llanelli is connected to the National Cycle Network from the north on NCR 43, and along the coast from the east and west on NCR 4. These routes link with a cycle path to the town centre.

Education

Primary and secondary

The first Welsh-medium primary school, Ysgol Gymraeg Dewi Sant, was founded in Llanelli in 1947. The English-medium secondary schools are St John Lloyd, Bryngwyn and Coedcae; the only Welsh medium secondary school is Ysgol y Strade. St Michael's School is a private school for ages 3–18. Ysgol Heol Goffa is a special school for pupils with disabilities.

Further and higher education
Coleg Sir Gâr (Carmarthenshire College), with its main campus at Graig near Pwll, provides a college education for most of the town's further education students and some vocational undergraduate degrees through the University of Wales. There are sixth form colleges at Ysgol Gyfun y Strade (Welsh medium) and St Michael's (English medium).

Prince Philip Hospital has a postgraduate centre for medical training run by Cardiff University's School of Postgraduate Medical and Dental Education.

Government

Llanelli is in the Llanelli parliamentary constituency, currently represented by the Labour party member Nia Griffith Member of Parliament (MP), and by the Senedd constituency of Labour's Lee Waters MS. Llanelli is run on a community level by Llanelli Town Council and Llanelli Rural Council (depending on the area of town) and Carmarthenshire County Council at local government level. Llanelli Rural Council addresses some part of the town, but mainly the Llanelli Rural community. Llanelli's politics has been Labour-dominated for decades. Its geographical location has led to a sense of exceptionalism in relation to the rest of Carmarthenshire, which is dominated by Plaid Cymru. In reaction to this, there have been calls to reinstate the local government district of Llanelli either as a county or as the City of Llanelli.

The community of Llanelli is bordered by those of Llanelli Rural, Llanrhidian Higher and Llanrhidian Lower, the last two being in the City and County of Swansea. Llanelli Borough Council, based at Llanelli Town Hall, was the area local authority until Carmarthenshire County Council became the unitary authority in 1996.

Twinning
Llanelli is twinned with  Agen, France.

Town areas

Bigyn
Glanymôr
Llanerch
Machynys
Morfa
Tyisha
New Dock
Sandy
Stradey

Towns and villages near Llanelli

Current developments

Llanelli Waterside
Llanelli Waterside, a joint venture between Carmarthenshire County Council and the Welsh Assembly Government, aims to transform the waterfront into a business, leisure and residential community. There are two seafront housing developments under construction. Pentre Nicklaus Village, located on the Machynys Peninsula has been criticised for being above the price range for local people. Pentre Doc Y Gogledd (North Dock Village) in the historic North Dock area is nearing completion by the firm of David McLean.

Notable people
See :Category:People from Llanelli
Notable Llanelli people with a Wikipedia page in alphabetical order by section:

Art, media and entertainment
Juliet Ace (born 1938), playwright and dramatist
Simon Armstrong (living), film, television and stage actor
David Brazell (1875–1959), opera singer and early recording artist
Ronald Cass (1923–2006), film writer and composer
Eleanor Daniels (1886–1994), stage and silent film actress
Huw Edwards (born 1961), BBC News chief presenter 
Cerith Wyn Evans (born 1958) conceptual artist, sculptor and film-maker
Peter Anthony Freeman (living), author and storyteller
Jessica Garlick (born 1981), Eurovision Song Contest 2002 UK entrant and Pop Idol finalist
Gareth Hughes (1894–1965), silent film actor, born in Halfway/Pemberton
Julie Gore (born 1958), singer, songwriter, TV presenter and darts player
James Dickson Innes (1887–1914), artist
Deke Leonard (1944–2017), rock musician, author, raconteur and TV panellist
Elizabeth Morgan (born 1930), actress and writer
Terry Morris (born 1965), artist and photographer
Natasha O'Keeffe (born 1986), television actress
John Owen-Jones (born 1971), actor
Christopher Rees (born 1973), singer, songwriter and musician
Rachel Roberts (1927–1980), actress
Dorothy Squires (1915–1998), singer and second wife of actor Roger Moore
Donald Swann (1923–1994), of the Flanders and Swann duo
Huw Thomas (1927–2009), ITN newscaster
Imogen Thomas (born 1982), Big Brother contestant and glamour model
Jeffrey Thomas (born 1945), acting star of Hercules: The Legendary Journeys and Spartacus: Gods of the Arena

Government and politics
Robert Buckland (born 1968), Conservative Lord Chancellor
Michael Howard (born 1941), Conservative Party leader (2003–2005)
Lord Elwyn Jones (1909–1989), Labour Lord Chancellor
Sir Tom O'Brien (1900–1970), Labour MP and trade unionist
Rod Richards (1947–2019), Conservative MP and leader in the National Assembly for Wales
David Thomas (1880–1967), Labour organizer and trade unionist

Sports

Rugby Union
Phil Bennett (1948–2022), Wales and British Lions
Jonathan Davies (born 1962), Wales in rugby league and rugby union
Ieuan Evans (born 1964), Wales and British Lions
Ray Gravell (1951–2007), Wales and British Lions, actor and broadcaster.
Carwyn James (1929–1983), Wales, coach of Llanelli and British Lions
Gareth Jenkins (born 1951), Wales, coach of Llanelli, Llanelli Scarlets and Wales
Barry John (born 1945), Cardiff, Wales and British Lions
Dwayne Peel (born 1981), Wales and British Lions
Derek Quinnell (born 1949), Wales and British Lions

Darts
Jonny Clayton (born 1974), professional

Association football
Wyndham Evans (born 1951), player, manager and commentator
Emyr Huws (born 1993), Wales and Ipswich Town F.C.
Matthew Jones (born 1980), Wales and premier league footballer and manager
Kyle Letheren (born 1987), Plymouth Argyle F.C. goalkeeper
Byron Stevenson (1956–2007), Wales

Other sports
Jeff Evans (born 1954), cricket umpire
Dai Greene (born 1986), 400m hurdler, world champion and IAAF gold medalist
Terry Griffiths (born 1947), world snooker champion (1979)
Neil Haddock (born 1964), boxer, British superfeatherweight champion
Evan Hoyt (born 1995), professional tennis
Edward Laverack (born 1994), professional cyclist
Flex Lewis (born 1983), bodybuilder
Melbourne Tierney (born 1924), rugby league
Eirian Williams (born 1955), snooker referee

Other categories
Leslie Griffiths (born 1942), Methodist minister and life peer
William Lloyd (1725–1796), Royal Navy admiral
Gwladys Yvonne McKeon (1897–1979), Llanelli-born Australian marine biologist
Sir John Meurig Thomas (1932–2020), chemist and science historian
Brian Trubshaw (1924–2001), pilot of first flight of British Concorde
Phil Prosser CBE, British army brigadier, Commander of 101 Logistics Brigade in charge of COVID-19 vaccine roll-out

See also
Llanelli riots of 1911
Llanelly power station

References

Further reading
The Llanelli Landscape, by D. Q. Bowen, 1980. 
Llanelli, Story of a Town, by John Edwards, 2001. 
Real Llanelli, by Jon Gower, 2009. 
Homes of Historic Interest in and around Llanelli, by William & Benita Afan Rees, 2011.

External links

Llanelli Rural Council
Llanelli Town Council
Llanelli Town Guide
Photos of Llanelli and surrounding area
Llanelli Community Heritage - Promoting Llanelli's rich heritage

 
Towns in Carmarthenshire
Communities in Carmarthenshire
Populated coastal places in Wales
Ports and harbours of Wales